Franklin Ray Lickliter II (born July 28, 1969) is an American professional golfer. He featured in the top 50 of the Official World Golf Ranking, going as high as 41st in 2001.

Early life
Lickliter was born in Middletown, Ohio, adjacent to his hometown of Franklin, Ohio.  Lickliter is a 1987 graduate of Franklin High School and a 1991 graduate of nearby Wright State University.

Professional career
Lickliter turned professional in 1991. He first joined the Nike Tour (now called the Korn Ferry Tour), where he earned a win in 1995. He joined the PGA Tour in 1996, and won events in 2001 and 2003. His best finish in a major is T4 at the 1998 PGA Championship. 

In 2007 he finished 139th on the PGA Tour money list, which was not good enough to retain his card for 2008. He earned his card for 2008 by being medalist at the 2007 PGA Tour Qualifying Tournament. Lickliter was not fully exempt on the PGA Tour after 2009.

Professional wins (3)

PGA Tour wins (2)

PGA Tour playoff record (0–1)

Nike Tour wins (1)

Results in major championships

CUT = missed the half-way cut
WD = withdrew
"T" = tied

Summary

Most consecutive cuts made – 3 (2001 U.S. Open – 2002 U.S. Open)
Longest streak of top-10s – 1

Results in The Players Championship

CUT = missed the halfway cut
"T" indicates a tie for a place

Results in World Golf Championships

QF, R16, R32, R64 = Round in which player lost in match play

Results in senior major championships

"T" indicates a tie for a place
NT = No tournament due to COVID-19 pandemic

See also
1995 PGA Tour Qualifying School graduates
1996 PGA Tour Qualifying School graduates
2005 PGA Tour Qualifying School graduates
2007 PGA Tour Qualifying School graduates

References

External links

American male golfers
PGA Tour golfers
PGA Tour Champions golfers
Golfers from Ohio
Golfers from Florida
Wright State University alumni
Sportspeople from Middletown, Ohio
People from Franklin, Ohio
People from Ponte Vedra Beach, Florida
Sportspeople from the Cincinnati metropolitan area
1969 births
Living people